Mircea Miclea (born 8 November 1963) is a Romanian professor, psychologist and politician. 

Born in Cioara, Alba County, he is the professor and director of The Centre for Applied Cognitive Psychology, at Babeș-Bolyai University in Cluj-Napoca. He served as the General Chancellor of the university from 2001 to 2004. In 2001, he was named the UNESCO Chair on Higher Education Management and Governance. In 2006, he was named Head of The Presidential Commission for analysis and elaboration of policies in education and research.

Miclea was the Minister of Education and Research in the Tăriceanu I Cabinet, from December 29, 2004, to November 10, 2005.

Affiliations 
 1995: International Affiliate Member of American Psychological Association
 1996–present: European Society for Cognitive Psychology (local officer)
 1996: Psychonomic Society Affiliate
 1997: International Council of Psychologists
 2000–present: Netherlands Institute of Advanced Study
 1996–present: President of Romanian Association for Cognitive Sciences
 2006–present: President of Romanian Psychological Association

Honors and awards 
 1992: Romanian Academy of Science
 1999: Milton Erickson Gessellschaft fur Clinische Hypnose Award

References 

1963 births
Living people
Academic staff of Babeș-Bolyai University
People from Alba County
Romanian Ministers of Education